Caenis candida is a species of mayfly in the genus Caenis. It is endemic to Quebec, Canada.

References

 ITIS Report October 22, 2016.  Retrieved October 22, 2016.

Mayflies
Endemic fauna of Quebec
Endemic fauna of Canada
Insects described in 1981